Belsky is a rural locality (a village) in Sakhayevsky Selsoviet, Karmaskalinsky District, Bashkortostan, Russia. The population was 407 as of 2010. There are 4 streets.

Geography 
Belsky is located 21 km northeast of Karmaskaly (the district's administrative centre) by road. Sakhayevo is the nearest rural locality.

References 

Rural localities in Karmaskalinsky District